With an area of 135km² Mwabvi Wildlife Reserve is Malawi’s smallest national park, and its least accessible. Nevertheless, it has a wide variety of habitats, including Mopane, Combretum and brachystegia woodland, as well as open savanna, dambo, and riverine areas. Mwabvi was the last natural home to Malawi's Black Rhino population, but both wildlife and woodland have been poached over recent years. However many species of antelope, including kudu, sable, impala and nyala, are present, and even leopard and hyena have been seen. Buffalo still bathe in the Mwabvi river, and, although the number of human tourists is low, lions from neighbouring Mozambique are regular visitors. The scenery is spectacular, with views over the Shire River and the Zambesi river, and the magnificent sandstone outcrops give an almost lunar feel to the landscape.

Mwabvi is located in Nsanje District, at the very southernmost point of Malawi, right against the border with Mozambique. It includes a portion of the Matundwe Range, which form the border with Mozambique, and the adjacent Shire River lowlands. The park lies at a low elevation and summer temperatures are extreme.  The best time for game viewing is during Malawi's cooler winter months. Mwabvi is not far from Lengwe National Park and the Majete Wildlife Reserve.

Travel through the park is only possible on foot or with a robust 4x4, but the park is manned and thanks to PAW's extensive road building programme both game walks and game drives are available and can be arranged with the game scouts or via Chipembere Camp, the base for Project African Wilderness. 

Project African Wilderness, a not for profit organisation, was formed in 2004 with the express purpose of protecting and restoring the Mwabvi reserve, working with the local communities and improving their livelihoods as a result. In February 2007 Project African Wilderness signed a management agreement with the Malawi Government's Department of National Parks and Wildlife to take over the conservation and development of the park.  Because of poaching, the park has seen a substantial depletion of its larger animal population, although efforts are underway to restore the park's infrastructure and diversity.

In 2010, as a result of the work done by project African Wilderness and their Malawian sister company the Mwabvi Wildlife and Community Trust (MWCT) Mwabvi opened Njate Lodge, with six en-suite chalets, and, for the more adventurous traveller, Migudu campsite, which has plots for 6 tents and provides washing and camp fire facilities.

External links 
 Description by malawitourism.com
 Description by Africa Guide

Protected areas of Malawi
Protected areas established in 1953
Geography of Southern Region, Malawi